Wyvern Academy is  a coeducational secondary school with academy status, located in the Branksome area of Darlington, County Durham, England. It schools pupils aged 11 to 16, and is the default school for most residents living in the Branksome/Faverdale/Cockerton areas of Darlington. The school was originally known as Branksome Comprehensive School until renamed the Darlington School of Maths and Science in 2011.

History
 
In 1977, the school was used as the location for an edition of We Are the Champions (TV series).

In 2009, the school was officially designated as a Science and Mathematics College. The school converted to academy status in January 2012.

In 2011, the school was renamed from Branksome Comprehensive School to Darlington School of Maths and Science alongside refurbishments to the school.

In 2014, Darlington School of Maths and Science celebrated the 50th Anniversary.

In 2017, the school renamed itself from Darlington School of Maths and Science to Wyvern Academy. The rebranding occurred after the school was taken over by Consilium Academy Trust.

References

External links 
 

Secondary schools in the Borough of Darlington
Academies in the Borough of Darlington
Schools in Darlington